Kumas (also Romanized as Kūmās and Khūmās) is a village in Shurab Rural District, Veysian District, Dowreh County, Lorestan Province, Iran. At the 2006 census, its population was 255, in 57 families.

References 

Towns and villages in Dowreh County